The 2008 United Indoor Football season was preceded by 2007. It was the fourth and final season of the UIF.  For this year, there were 8 teams (4 teams in 2 conferences) playing a 15-game season schedule with all teams playing 14 regular season games from Saturday, March 8 to Saturday, June 14.  The winning team was decided in United Bowl IV on Saturday, July 12.  For the fourth-straight year, the Sioux Falls Storm became the UIF champion as they beat the Bloomington Extreme.

Following United Bowl IV, the champion played against the Intense Football League champion (the Louisiana Swashbucklers) on Saturday, August 2 and won the inaugural National Indoor Bowl. The National Indoor Bowl was popular enough to allow the two leagues (UIF and IFL) create a new league called the Indoor Football League for 2009.

Standings

 Green indicates clinched playoff berth
 Purple indicates division champion
 Grey indicates best league record

Playoffs

All-Star Game

 Located at the Tyson Events Center in Sioux City, Iowa on Saturday, July 19

All-Star Teams

United Indoor Football seasons
2008 in American football